Little River (Dubbo), a watercourse of the Macquarie catchment within the Murray–Darling basin, is located in the central western and Orana districts of New South Wales, Australia.

The river rises in Curumbeyenya Range within Goobang National Park, west of Molong and flows generally north north-east, joined by three minor tributaries, before reaching its confluence with the Macquarie River west of Geurie; descending  over its  course.

See also

Rivers of New South Wales
List of rivers of Australia

References

External links
 

Rivers of New South Wales
Tributaries of the Macquarie River